Maleyevskaya is a rural locality (a village) in Yavengskoye Rural Settlement, Vozhegodsky District, Vologda Oblast, Russia. The population was 14 as of 2002.

Geography 
Maleyevskaya is located 37 km northeast of Vozhega (the district's administrative centre) by road. Tarasovskaya is the nearest rural locality.

References 

Rural localities in Vozhegodsky District